Abū Yaʿqūb Yūsuf al-Hamadānī, best simply known as Yusuf Hamadani (born 1048 or 1049 / 440 AH - died 1140 / 535 AH), was a Persian Sufi of the Middle Ages. He was the first of the group of Central Asian Sufi teachers known simply as Khwajagan (the Masters) of the Naqshbandi order. His shrine is at Merv, Turkmenistan.

Life

Born in Buzanjird near Hamadan in 1062, he moved to Baghdad when he was eighteen years of age. He studied the Shafi'i school of fiqh under the supervision of the master of his time, Shaykh Ibrahim ibn Ali ibn Yusuf al-Fairuzabadi. He kept association in Baghdad with the great scholar, Abu Ishaq al-Shirazi, who gave him greater deference than to any of his other students although he was the youngest. But he was a Hanafi Maturidi unlike his teachers.

According to Ibn Khallikan, he began his religious career with the cultivation of the religious sciences, becoming both a respected scholar of hadith and fiqh and a popular preacher in Baghdad. He was so brilliant a jurisprudent that he became the Marja of his time for all scholars in that field. He was known in Baghdad, the center of Islamic knowledge, in Isfahan, Bukhara, Samarqand, Khwarazm, and throughout Central Asia.

Later he abandoned these pursuits, adopting an intensely ascetic way of life and travelled east, first settling in Herat and later in Merv, where his tomb is still reputed to exist. He became an ascetic and engaged in constant worship and mujahada (spiritual struggle), instructed by Shaykh Abu 'Ali al-Farmadhi. He associated with Shaykh Abdullah Ghuwayni and Shaykh Hasan Simnani. He named four khalifas or successors, a pattern that repeated itself for several succeeding generations of the Khwajagan, including Ahmad Yasawi and Khwaja Abdul Khaliq Gajadwani, the next link in the Naqshbandi silsila.

In popular culture 
The Turkish television series Mavera: Hace Ahmed Yesevi (2021) is based on the life of poet Ahmad Yasawi (portrayed by the Turkish actor Korei Cezayirli), who was sent to Baghdad by his murshid (spiritual guide) Yusuf Hamadani.

See also
Naqshbandi

References

Sources
 Abu Ya`qub Yusuf ibn Ayyab ibn Yusuf ibn al-Husayn al-Hamadani——May Allah Sanctify His Soul; https://web.archive.org/web/20120303111446/http://www.naqshbandi.org/chain/9.htm

Further reading

 

Sufi teachers
1140 deaths
Iranian Sufis
Year of birth unknown
Year of birth uncertain
11th-century jurists
12th-century jurists
1062 births
Hanafis
Maturidis
Naqshbandi order
11th-century Iranian people
People from Hamadan
Iranian Muslim mystics
12th-century Iranian people